Vladan is a Serbo-Croatian masculine given name, a shorter form of Slavic dithematic names with the element vlad meaning "to rule, ruler". It is attested in Serbian society since the Middle Ages. The patronymic surname Vladanović is derived from the name. Feminine forms are Vladana and Vladanka.

It may refer to:

Vladan Alanović (born 1967), Croatian basketballer
Vladan Batić (born 1949), Serbian politician and statesman
Vladan Desnica (1905–1967), Yugoslav writer
Vladan Đogatović (born 1984), Serbian footballer
Vladan Đorđević (1844–1930), Serbian politician and statesman
Vladan Grujić (born 1981), Bosnian footballer
Vladan Kostić, Montenegrin footballer
Vladan Kujović (born 1978), Serbian footballer
Vladan Lukić (born 1970), Serbian footballer
Vladan Marković, Serbian swimmer
Vladan Matić (born 1970), Serbian handballer
Vladan Milosavljević (born 1980), Serbian footballer
Vladan Milovanović (born 1970), Serbian footballer
Vladan Pavlović (born 1984), Serbian footballer
Vladan Radača (born 1955), Serbian coach and former footballer
Vladan Savić (born 1979), Montenegrin footballer
Vladan Spasojević (born 1980), Serbian footballer
Vladan Vasilijević, Yugoslav specialist in criminal law
Vladan Vićević (born 1967), Yugoslavian-born Salvadoran football (soccer) player
Vladan Vukosavljević (disambiguation), several people
Vladan Živković (born 1941), Serbian actor

See also
Slavic names

References

 

Slavic masculine given names
Croatian masculine given names
Montenegrin masculine given names
Serbian masculine given names